Ingvard Sverdrup (24 September 1936 – 9 March 1997) was a Norwegian politician for the Conservative Party.

He was born in Kristiansund.

He was elected to the Norwegian Parliament from Møre og Romsdal in 1985, and was re-elected on one occasion. He had previously served in the position of deputy representative during the terms 1969–1973.

Sverdrup was a member of the executive committee of Kristiansund municipality council between 1963 and 1971. He was also the county mayor of Møre og Romsdal.

References

1936 births
1997 deaths
Politicians from Kristiansund
Conservative Party (Norway) politicians
Members of the Storting
20th-century Norwegian politicians